Plerogyra is a genus of cnidarians belonging to the family Euphylliidae.

The species of this genus are found in Indian and Atlantic Ocean, Suez Canal.

Species:

Plerogyra cauliformis 
Plerogyra diabolotus  - Devil's Bubble Coral
Plerogyra discus 
Plerogyra eurysepta 
Plerogyra multilobata 
Plerogyra simplex  - Branching Bubble Coral
Plerogyra sinuosa  - Bubble Coral

References

Euphylliidae
Anthozoa genera